The 1888–89 FAW Welsh Cup was the 12th edition of the annual knockout tournament for competitive football teams in Wales. The competition was won by Bangor.

First round

Group one

Source: Welsh Football Data Archive

Group two

Source: Welsh Football Data Archive

Group three

Source: Welsh Football Data Archive

Vale of Llangollen receive a bye to the next round

Replay

Source: Welsh Football Data Archive

Group four

Source: Welsh Football Data Archive

Davenham receive a bye to the next round

Second round

Source: Welsh Football Data Archive

Bangor receive a bye to the next round
 Match protested regarding poor light, re-play was organised
 Match protested regarding ineligible man, re-play was organised

Replay

Source: Welsh Football Data Archive

 match abandoned after poor light

Second replay

Source: Welsh Football Data Archive

Third round

Source: Welsh Football Data Archive

Chirk AAA receive bye to next round
 match protested, re-play was organised

Replay

Source: Welsh Football Data Archive

Semi-final

Source: Welsh Football Data Archive

Replay

Source: Welsh Football Data Archive

.

Final

References

 Welsh Football Data Archive

1888-89
1888–89 domestic association football cups
1888–89 in Welsh football